Eupithecia pseudassimilata is a moth in the family Geometridae. It is found in Russia and Japan.

References

Moths described in 1988
pseudassimilata
Moths of Japan
Moths of Asia